Geraldine Kattnig (4 February 1920 – 9 November 1995) was an Austrian actress. She appeared in more than ten films from 1936 to 1951.

Selected filmography

References

External links 

1920 births
1995 deaths
Austrian film actresses
Actresses from Vienna